Pearl was an American literary journal published between 1974 and 2014 in Long Beach, California.

History and profile
Pearl was founded by Joan Jobe Smith in 1974. The first issue appeared in May 1974. It was edited by Joan Jobe Smith, Marilyn Johnson, and Barbara Hauk. Pearl was based in Long Beach. It released an annual fiction issue and an annual poetry issue as well as hosting an annual poetry prize.

After several issues published Pearl went defunct until 1986 when Joan Jobe Smith and Marilyn Johnson relaunched it.

The magazine ceased publication in 2014.

Contributors
Charles Bukowski
Jim Daniels
Ed Ochester
Frank X. Gaspar
Robert Peters
 Fred Voss
 Billy Collins

See also
List of literary magazines

References

External links
Pearl's Homepage

Biannual magazines published in the United States
Defunct literary magazines published in the United States
Magazines established in 1974
Magazines disestablished in 2014
Magazines published in California
Poetry magazines published in the United States